Vändra is a borough in Põhja-Pärnumaa Parish in Pärnu County, Estonia. It has a population of 2,191 and an area of 3.28 km².

Vändra is the birthplace of Estonian journalist and poet Johann Voldemar Jannsen (1819–1890) and his daughter, poet Lydia Koidula (1843–1886).

Notable people
Karl von Ditmar (1822–1892), Baltic-German geologist and explore
Tanel Kangert (born 1987), professional cyclist
Alar Laneman (born 1962), politician
Artur Lind (1927–1989), biologist 
Ain-Ervin Mere (1905-1969), military officer implicated in the Holocaust trials in Soviet Estonia in 1961
Andres Metsoja (born 1978), politician
Agnes Oaks (born 1970), ballet dancer
Anton Õunapuu (1887–1919), physical education teacher, soldier and founder of the Boy Scouts movement in Estonia
Tarvo Seeman (born 1969), chess player

References

External links
Official website 

Municipalities of Estonia
Boroughs and small boroughs in Estonia
Populated places in Pärnu County
Kreis Pernau